Lasnamäe Airfield was an airfield in Tallinn, Estonia. Nowadays its former runway and taxiways are covered by apartment buildings and a street network.

References

RussianAirFields.com

Defunct airports in Estonia
Transport in Tallinn
Soviet Air Force bases
History of Tallinn
Buildings and structures in Tallinn
Former buildings and structures in Estonia